The Vasyugan Swamp is the largest swamp in the northern hemisphere as well as the largest peatland in the world. It is located in Russia, in southwestern Siberia.

The swamp is a major reservoir of fresh water for the region, and the Vasyugan river has its source there. It is home to a number of endangered species which is a concern among local environmentalists as the production of oil and gas has become a major industry in the region.

Location

It occupies , which is about 2% of the whole area of peat bogs of the world. The swamp is located in the Novosibirsk, Omsk, and Tomsk regions of Russia along the west bank of the Ob River, and stretches between latitudes 55°35' and 58°40' North, and longitudes 74°30' and 83°30' East. It has about 800,000 small lakes in it.

History
It appeared nearly 10,000 years ago and from that time has constantly increased in size. 75% of the contemporary area became waterlogged less than 500 years ago.

Climate
The swamp has a continental climate (Walter system) or taiga (WWF system), with long cold winters and short hot summers.

References

External links

 Whc.unesco.org

Swamps of Russia
Landforms of Novosibirsk Oblast
Landforms of Omsk Oblast
Landforms of Tomsk Oblast
World Heritage Tentative List
Irtysh basin
Ob basin
Peatlands
West Siberian Plain